The Union was a  64-gun ship of the line of the French Navy. She was funded by a don des vaisseaux donation from individuals.

The construction of Union, initially ordered in 1755, dragged on until 1763. In 1767, she cruised off Morocco under Captain Pierre-Claude Haudeneau de Breugnon.

In 1778, she was converted into a hospital ship and was appointed to a squadron under Admiral d'Orvilliers. She was eventually wrecked in February 1782

External links 

 Ships of the line

Ships of the line of the French Navy
1763 ships
Don des vaisseaux